In geometry, a glissette is a curve determined by either the locus of any point, or the envelope of any line or curve, that is attached to a curve that slides against or along two other fixed curves.

Examples

Ellipse
A basic example is that of a line segment of which the endpoints slide along two perpendicular lines.  The glissette of any point on the line forms an ellipse.

Astroid
Similarly, the envelope glissette of the line segment in the example above is an astroid.

Conchoid
Any conchoid may be regarded as a glissette, with a line and one of its points sliding along a given line and fixed point.

References

External links 
 Glissette at Wolfram Mathworld

Curves